Major Bikramjeet Kanwarpal (29 August 1968  1 May 2021) was an Indian film and television actor. A retired army officer, Kanwarpal had played supporting roles in many films and television serials. Kanwarpal shared screen space with actor Anil Kapoor in 24.

Early life and career
Kanwarpal was born in Solan, Himachal Pradesh, India. He was the son of an Indian Army officer, Lt Col Dwarka Nath Kanwarpal, who was awarded the Kirti Chakra in 1963. In 1986, Bikramjeet Kanwarpal completed his Higher Secondary Examination from The Lawrence School, Sanawar, and in 1989, he was commissioned into the Indian Army. He retired from the army in 2002 as a Major. In 2003, he debuted in Bollywood to fulfill his childhood dream of being an actor and had acted since then in many films. He was last seen in Hindi Film Shinaakht directed by Pragyesh Singh.

Filmography

Films

 Page 3
 Paap as Ratan Singh
 Karam as Sub Inspector Naik
 Corporate as Sr V P - Sehgal Group
 Don as Dr Ashok Khilwani
 Kya Love Story Hai as Mr Mehta
 Khushboo: The Fragraance of Love
 Hijack as Amrinder Singh
 Thanks Maa as Zaveri
 Rocket Singh: Salesman of the Year as Inamdar  
 Atithi Tum Kab Jaoge? as Munmun's Boss 
 Knockout as Nidhi's Boss
 Turning 30!!! as Rathore
 Aarakshan
 My Friend Pinto as Ronnie
 Murder 2 as Commissioner Ahmed Khan
 Bumboo as Inspector
 Joker
 Jab Tak Hai Jaan as Samar Anand's Senior Army Officer
 Shaurya as Col.Inyat Khan
 1971 as Col. Shakoor
 Dangerous Ishhq
 Kya Super Kool Hain Hum as Priest
 Chance Pe Dance as Bhutiya, Football Coach
 Mallika
 Zanjeer as Kataria
 Heyy Babyy as Advocate Mishra
 Heroine
 Shortcut Romeo as Suraj's Uncle
 Grand Masti
 Horror Story
 Riwayat
 Hate Story 2 as Photography professor
 Creature 3D as Inspector Chaubey
2 States as Rajji Mama
 Rahasya as Hansal Chabria
 Anjaan (Tamil)
 Prem Ratan Dhan Payo as Estate agent
 Mr. X as Devraj Verma
 Bhaag Johnny as Third Eye Detective
 Ferrous as Inspector Jagdeesh Sinchwal
  The Ghazi Attack as Pakistan navy staff officer
  Indu Sarkar as Kela Chand
  Drive as Rathore
  Bypass Road as Dr Kamlesh
  The Power as Chedda
  Shinaakht as Syed Qadri (short film)
 Madha (2020) (Telugu) as BalasubramaniamDoctor (2021) (Tamil) as Terry's Father

Television shows

 24 Kismat as Nawab Mubarak Khan
 Namak Haraam Simply Sapney Mere Rang Mein Rangne Waali Crime Patrol-Dastak Adaalat as Public Prosecutor Randhawa
 Har Yug Mein Aayega Ek Arjun as D.I.G Dustin Coelho
 Neeli Chhatri Waale Diya Aur Baati Hum Reporters as Khalid
 Siyasat Halla Bol (Bindass) as the Baba Ji in episode 11
 Kasam Tere Pyaar Ki as Balraaj Kapoor
 Yeh Hai Chahatein as Niketan Singhania
 Dil Hi Toh Hai as a surgeon
 Tenali Rama (TV series) as King Dhananjay Mudriya
 Avrodh: The Siege Within as Colonel Ajay Saxena (web series)
 Special OPS as G.P. Mathur (web series)
 Shrikant Bashir as First SOT Chief (web series)
 Dev DD 2''

Web series

Death
Bikramjeet Kanwarpal died from COVID-19 on 1 May 2021, at the age of 52.

References

External links
 
 Actor Bikramjit Kanwarpal Passes away due to Corona at age of 52

1968 births
2021 deaths
Male actors from Himachal Pradesh
Indian Army officers
Punjabi people
Deaths from the COVID-19 pandemic in India
People from Solan